This is a list of secondary highways in Manitoulin District, which serve the isolated and sparsely populated areas in the Manitoulin District of Ontario.

Highway 540 

Secondary Highway 540, commonly referred to as Highway 540, is the primary east–west secondary highway on Manitoulin Island in the Canadian province of Ontario. At , it is the longest highway on the island. It travels from the hamlet of Meldrum Bay, near the western end of the island, to Highway 6 in the community of Little Current. Two suffixed routes branch off from Highway 540: Highway 540A extends  from the highway onto Barrie Island; and Highway 540B, a short business spur, travels north  to Gore Bay.

Highway 540A 

Secondary Highway 540A, commonly referred to as Highway 540A, is a secondary highway in the Canadian province of Ontario, linking Manitoulin Island with Barrie Island.

Its western terminus is 5th Sideroad and South Line Road on Barrie Island, and its eastern terminus is at Highway 540. At the midpoint of the route, there is a junction with Airport Road, which leads to Gore Bay-Manitoulin Airport.

Highway 540B 

Secondary Highway 540B, commonly referred to as Highway 540B, is a short secondary highway on Manitoulin Island in Northern Ontario, which serves as a business spur linking the town of Gore Bay with Highway 540.

Although many commercial map providers provide conflicting information regarding the route, the highway begins at an intersection with Highway 540 and Poplar Road. From this intersection it travels north along Range Street, and enters Gore Bay. Within the town, the highway curves east, becoming Main Street. It travels into the town, then turns south onto Meredith Street. The highway turns east onto Agnes Street and gradually curves southeast. In front of the United Hall Church, the road curves south and becomes Gore Street. After a kilometre, Gore Street curves east and becomes Wright Street. This short street ends at the boundary of Gore Bay, at which point drivers must turn south to remain on the highway, which ends at a four-way intersection with Highway 540 and Highway 542. The section within the town limits of Gore Bay is maintained under a Connecting Link agreement.

Highway 542 

Secondary Highway 542, commonly referred to as Highway 542, is a secondary highway on Manitoulin Island in the Canadian province of Ontario. It links the township of Gore Bay to Tehkummah and Highway 6. Its western terminus is Highway 540, and before its eastern terminus is at Highway 6, near Tehkummah, it passes through the small villages of Advance, Long Bay, Britainville, Spring Bay, Dryden's Corner, Monument Corner, Central Manitoulin, Mindemoya, Gibraltar, and Sandfield.

Highway 542A 

Secondary Highway 542A, commonly referred to as Highway 542A, is a secondary highway on Manitoulin Island in the Canadian province of Ontario. It links the township of Tehkummah to Highway 542. Its western terminus is 10th Sideroad and Concession Road 2 in Tehkummah, and its eastern terminus is at Highway 542.

Highway 551 

Secondary Highway 551, commonly referred to as Highway 551, is a secondary highway in the Canadian province of Ontario.

From Dryden's Corner, Highway 551 extends southerly a further  to its terminus at Government Road the shore of Lake Huron just outside the community of Providence Bay.

References

External links 
 Route of Highway 540B on Google Maps. Points A to B represent the route marked by MapArt; Points A to C represent the full route.
 Route of Highway 551 on Google Maps

 
Roads in Manitoulin District